Symethis is a genus of crabs. It differs from other genera in the family Raninidae by the lack of ornamentation of the male first pleopods and by the reduced number of gills (7 pairs rather than 8 pairs), and is therefore placed in a separate subfamily, Symethinae.

There are three extant species:
Symethis corallica Davie, 1989 – Chesterfield Reefs, Coral Sea 
Symethis garthi Goeke, 1981 – Pacific coast of Panama 
Symethis variolosa (Fabricius, 1793) – western Atlantic Ocean, from North Carolina, to Bahia, Brazil 

One further species, Symethis johnsoni is known from fossils of Paleogene age, but may belong in the subfamily Lyreidinae rather than in Symethis.

References

Crabs
Paleogene genus first appearances
Extant Paleogene first appearances